Benjamin Lee is a professor of anthropology and philosophy at The New School, where he also served as provost from 2006 until 2008. Lee's primary academic interests include contemporary China; the cultural dimensions of globalization, particularly the effects of global financial flows; and modern theories of language.

Lee graduated from Johns Hopkins University with a BA in psychology and later attended the University of Chicago, where he received an MA in human development and a PhD in anthropology.

Selected publications 

 From Primitives to Derivatives (coauthor, 2004)
 Derivatives and the Globalization of Risk (coauthor, 2004)
 "The Subjects of Circulation," in U. Hedetoft and M. Hjort (Eds.)
 The Postnational Self: Belonging and Identity (2002)
 "Cultures of Circulation: The Imaginations of Modernity," Public Culture (coauthor, 2002)
 "Peoples and Publics," Public Culture (1998)
 Talking Heads: Language, Metalanguage, and the Semiotics of Subjectivity (1997)
 "Critical Internationalism," Public Culture (1995)
 "Going Public," Public Culture (1993)
 Semiotics, Self, and Society (coeditor, 1989)
Semiotic Origins of the Mind Body Dualism (in Semiotics, Self, ...) 
 Developmental Approaches to the Self (coeditor, 1983)
 Psychosocial Theories of the Self (editor, 1982)
 The Development of Adaptive Intelligence (coauthor, 1974)

References 
 The New School Faculty Page

Living people
Year of birth missing (living people)
The New School faculty
Rice University faculty
University of Chicago alumni